Mahmoud Rashid (born 4 December 1942) is an Iraqi weightlifter. He competed in the men's lightweight event at the 1964 Summer Olympics.

References

1942 births
Living people
Iraqi male weightlifters
Olympic weightlifters of Iraq
Weightlifters at the 1964 Summer Olympics
Place of birth missing (living people)
20th-century Iraqi people